Bolívar's campaign to liberate New Granada was part of the Colombian and Venezuelan wars of independence and was one of the many military campaigns fought by Simón Bolívar. Bolívar's victory in New Granada (today, Colombia, Venezuela, Ecuador and Panama) secured the eventual independence of northern South America. It provided Bolívar with the economic and human resources to complete his victory over the Spanish in Venezuela and Colombia. Bolívar's attack on New Granada is considered one of the most daring in military history, compared by contemporaries and some historians to Napoleon's crossing of the Alps in 1800 and José San Martín's Crossing of the Andes in 1817.

Background
During the years 1815 and 1816, Spain had reconquered most of New Granada after five years of de facto and official independence. By 1817, Bolívar had set up his headquarters in the Orinoco region in southern Venezuela. It was an area from which the Spaniards could not easily oust him. There he engaged the services of several thousand foreign soldiers and officers, mostly British and Irish, set up his capital at Angostura (now Ciudad Bolívar) and established liaisons with the revolutionary forces of the Llanos, including one group of Venezuelan llaneros (cowboys) led by José Antonio Páez and another group of New Granadan exiles led by Francisco de Paula Santander.

By 1819, José María Barreiro, who was in charge of the royalist troops in New Granada, counted with at least 4,500 trained soldiers at his command (without including the troops scattered throughout the region). Bolivar was able to round up merely 2,200 able men, which he distributed into four battalions, three regiments, one squadron, and an artillery company that lacked cannons. In the most part, Bolivar's soldiers were non-Spanish men, many of them recruited from the Venezuelan plains. Simon Bolivar's plan consisted of mobilizing his army from Venezuela to Casanare, in New Granada, to unite forces with Francisco de Paula Santander and his men, and infiltrate the territory through Tunja to combat the troops of Viceroy Juán de Sámano.

The campaign
Bolívar conceived of the operation in late 1818 and early 1819 after the Congress of Angostura began its deliberations and had reappointed him president of Venezuela.  If Bolívar could liberate New Granada, he would have a whole new base from which to operate against Pablo Morillo, head of the royalist forces in the area. Central New Granada held great promise since, unlike Venezuela, it had only been recently conquered by Morillo and it had a prior six-year experience of independent government. Royalist sentiment, therefore, was not strong. But it would be hard to take the initiative against the better prepared and supplied royalist army. To surprise it, Bolívar decided to move during the rainy season, when the Llanos flooded up to a meter and the campaign season ended. Morillo's forces would be gone from the Llanos for months and no one would anticipate that Bolívar's troops would be on the move. The proposed route, however, was considered impassable, and therefore the plan understandably received little support from the Congress or from Páez. With only the forces he and Santander had recruited in the Apure and Meta River regions, Bolívar set off in June 1819.

The route that the small army of about 2,500 men—including a British legion—took went from the hot and humid, flood-swept plains of Venezuela to the icy mountain pass of the Páramo de Pisba, at an altitude of 3,960 meters (13,000 feet), through the Cordillera Oriental. After the hardships of wading through a virtual sea, the mostly llanero army was not prepared and poorly clothed for the cold and altitude of the mountains. Many became ill or died.

Despite some intelligence that Bolívar was on the move, the Spanish doubted Bolívar's army could make the trip, and therefore, they were taken by surprise when Bolívar's small army emerged from the mountains on 5 July. Bolívar rebuilt his forces by placing a levy on the local population. In a series of battles the republican army cleared its way to Bogotá. First at the Battle of Vargas Swamp on 25 July, Bolívar intercepted a royalist force attempting to reach the poorly defended capital. After the Battle of Vargas Swamp, Bolivar reorganized his men, resting them until 4 August, when he ordered a return to Venezuela. However, in the night, he redirected his forces towards Tunja, and took the city by mid-day of 5 August 1819. Due to Bolivar's flash conquest, Barreiro was obliged to mobilize his troops to defend the capital, Santafé, from Bolivar. The Royalist men took the fastest route to Bogota (which led through the Boyacá Bridge) but were unable to pass, as Bolivar intercepted them, early morning of 7 August. Bolivar's republican troops were composed of approximately 2,850 men, which successfully divided and defeated the 2,670 royalist soldiers in a battle that lasted two hours. The battle resulted in the death of 66 republicans, 250 royalists, as well as the capture of approximately 1,600 of the remaining royal troops. At the Battle of Boyacá on 7 August 1819, the bulk of the royalist army surrendered to Bolívar.

On the day of the battle of Boyacá, Colonel Barrerio (leader of the royalist forces in Nueva Granada) was captured alongside 37 Spanish officers. The 38 prisoners were executed on 11 October 1819 by decree of Francisco de Paula Santander, keeping true to Bolivar's motto of 'war to the death.' On receiving the news, the viceroy, Juan José de Sámano, and the rest of royalist government fled the capital to Cartagena de Indias so fast that they left behind the treasury. On the afternoon of 10 August Bolívar's army entered Bogotá without any royalist resistance. His arrival concluded the campaign for liberating Nueva Granada. The battle of Boyacá was a decisive triumph over Spanish power in Nueva Granada, and the Spanish America as a whole. Despite the Royalists' strength in the other provinces of the region, such as Santa Marta and Pasto – where resistance would withstand various years of revolutionary uprisings – the capital of the viceroyalty of Nueva Granada had fallen in the hands of the New Granadans.

Political ramifications
With New Granada secure Bolívar returned to Venezuela, in a position of unprecedented military, political and financial strength. In his absence the Congress had flirted with deposing him, assuming that he would meet his death in New Granada. The vice-president Francisco Antonio Zea was deposed and replaced by Juan Bautista Arismendi. All this was quickly reversed when word got to the Congress of Bolívar's success. In December Bolívar returned to Angostura, where he urged the Congress to proclaim the creation of a new state: the Republic of Colombia (Gran Colombia). It did so on 17 December and elected him president of the new country. Since two of its three regions, Venezuela and Quito (Ecuador), were still under royalist control, it was only a limited achievement. Bolívar continued his efforts against the royalist areas of Venezuela, culminating in the Battle of Carabobo two years later, which all but secured his control of northern South America. Bolívar's victory in New Granada was, therefore, a major turning point in the history of northern South America. With this shift in political power, the path was laid out for the union of Nueva Granada and Venezuela into the Republic of Colombia. However, the campaigns for independence would continue: Antonio José de Sucre marched South, towards Pasto, the Audiencia de Quito, the Viceroyalty of Peru, and the Alto Perú, while Bolivar sought to expand the campaign to the westernmost regions of Venezuela, which still lay under Spanish power, and counted with 27,000 soldiers for its defense.

See also
United Provinces of New Granada
Spanish reconquest of New Granada
Military career of Simón Bolívar
Gran Colombia

References

Further reading
 Lynch, John (2006). Simón Bolívar. A Life, New Haven: Yale University Press. .
 Masur, Gerhard (1969). Simón Bolívar (Revised edition). Albuquerque: University of New Mexico Press.
 Harvey, Robert. "Liberators: Latin America`s Struggle For Independence, 1810–1830". John Murray, London (2000). 
 Madariaga, Salvador de. (1952). Bolívar. Westport: Greenwood Press. 
 Mijares, Augusto (1983). The Liberator. Caracas: North American Association of Venezuela.

Gran Colombia
Conflicts in 1819
Conflicts in 1820
Colonial Colombia
Independence of Colombia
Viceroyalty of New Granada
Spanish American wars of independence
Wars involving Colombia
Wars involving Spain
1819 in Colombia
1820 in Colombia
1819 in Gran Colombia
1820 in Gran Colombia
1819 in the Viceroyalty of New Granada